Zanforlin is a surname. Notable people with the surname include:

Luca Zanforlin (born 1965), Italian television presenter
Marika Zanforlin (born 1983), Italian pairs skater and roller skater